James Robert French (27 November 1926 – February 2004) was an English footballer who made 53 appearances in the Football League playing as an inside forward for Northampton Town and Darlington in the 1950s. He was also on the books of Middlesbrough but never played for them in the League.

References

1926 births
2004 deaths
Footballers from Stockton-on-Tees
Footballers from County Durham
English footballers
Association football inside forwards
Middlesbrough F.C. players
Northampton Town F.C. players
Darlington F.C. players
English Football League players